Capital High School, located in Bhubaneswar, is one of the oldest schools in the Indian state of Odisha and was established in 1951. The school is situated in unit-III near Ram Mandir and is adjacent to St. Joseph's High School and The Blind School. It is affiliated to the Board of Secondary Education, Odisha under State Government of Odisha.  Ganesh Chandra Mishra was the first headmaster of the school and he took charge on 16 July 1951. After Mishra, many other teachers such as Laxman Kara and Sarat Chandra Basu have taken over the charge of Headmaster of this school and lead the school to more successes.

The school had its Diamond Jubilee Celebrations in April 2012. India Post has released a Special Cover on 60 years of Capital High School Bhubaneswar.

Description
The notable features of the Capital High School in Bhubaneswar are as follows: 
 It has given rise to many well known personalities in science, sports, politics and music etc.
 Excellent infrastructure within the school premises. The huge playground and prayer hall have been used for many state level activities.
 Much stress on formal education of the students as per curriculum
 Importance to games and other physical activities
 Stress on cultural activities like music, dance, art and craft etc.
 Sympathy towards the weaker sections of the society in the form of free hostel accommodation and financial aids.

Gallery

See also
 Badagada Government High School, Bhubaneswar
 Puri Zilla School
 Board of Secondary Education, Odisha
 Secondary Board High School

References

External links
 Official website 

Schools in Bhubaneswar
Educational institutions established in 1951
1951 establishments in Orissa